Plukenetia is a genus of plant of the family Euphorbiaceae. It is widespread in tropical regions of Africa, the Indian Subcontinent, Southeast Asia, and the Americas.

Species

formerly included
moved to other genera (Hamilcoa, Romanoa)

References

External links

Plukenetieae
Euphorbiaceae genera
Taxa named by Carl Linnaeus
Pantropical flora